This is a list of the books written by G. K. Chesterton.

1900–1909

 .
 .
 .
 .
 .
 .
 .
 .
 .
 .
 .
 .
 .
 .
 .
 .
 .
 .
 .
 .
 .
 .
 .

1910–1919
 , selected from Twelve Types.
 .
 .
 .
 .
 .
 .
 .
 .
 .
 .
 .
 .
 .
 .
 .
 .
 .
 .
 .
 .
 .
 .
 .
 .
 .
 .
 .
 .
 .
 .
 .

1920–1929
 .
 .
 .
 .
 .
 .
 .
 .
 .
 .
 .
 .
 .
 .
 .
 .
 .
 .
 .
 . Nine volumes.
 .
 .
 .
 .
 .
 .
 .
 .
 
 
 .
 .
 . 
 .
 .
 .
 .
 .
 .

1930–1936
 , separately in US as The Ecstatic Thief; The Honest Quack; The Loyal Traitor; The Moderate Murderer.
 .
 .
 .
 .
 .
 .
 .
 .
 .
 .
 .
 . 
 .
 .
 .
 .
 .
 .
 .
 .

Posthumous
 .
 
 .
 .
 , and many other reprint collections, including:
 ,
 ,
 ,
 ,
 ,
 ,
 ,
 .
 .
 .
 .
 .
 .
 .
 .
 .
 .
 .
 .
 .
 .
 .
 .
 .
 .
 .
 .
 .
 .
 .
 .
 .
 .
 .
 .
 .
 .
 .
 .
 .
 .
 .
 .
 .
 .
 .
 .
 .
 .
 .
 .
 .
 .
 .

References

 
 

Bibliographies by writer
Bibliography
Bibliographies of British writers
Christian bibliographies